Lieutenant-General Ahmed Raza (20 August 1910 – 21 December 1996) was a Pakistani statesman, diplomat, military figure, pacifist, cricketer, and a retired three-star rank army general in the Pakistan Army.

He was born into Pashtun Indian nobility in the home of  Ahmad Hasan Khan, an aristocrat and politician who served as British India's representative to the League of Nations. He was educated in England and at the Indian Military College at Dehradun, then the Indian Military Academy and served during World War II as an officer in the 18th K. E. O. Cavalry Regiment of the British Indian Army. After the Partition of India in 1947, he opted for Pakistan and joined Pakistan Army where he participated in the Indo-Pakistani war of 1965. He was the Chief of General Staff of East Pakistani military and eventually appointed its commander in 1967. He was appointed as Governor of East Pakistan in 1969 and 1971 but recalled to Pakistan after submitting resignation amid civil unrest. After retiring from the diplomatic service in 1987, he spent his remaining years in Islamabad, where he died in 1996.

He was also a cricketer who played first-class cricket in India and Pakistan. His highest score was 101 in 1934–35 in Northern India's first match in the Ranji Trophy, when he added 304 for the second wicket with George Abell.

He was a member of the Burki clan, of whom about 40 men have played first-class cricket. Three of his sisters became the mothers of Pakistan Test cricket captains: Iqbal Bano was the mother of Javed Burki; Mubarak married the Test cricketer Jahangir Khan and was the mother of Majid Khan; Shaukat was the mother of Imran Khan.

References

External links

1910 births
1996 deaths
Cricketers from Jalandhar
Burki family
Pashtun people
Pakistani cricketers